The sequence hypothesis was first formally proposed in the review "On Protein Synthesis" by Francis Crick in 1958. It states that the sequence of bases in the genetic material (DNA or RNA) determines the sequence of amino acids for which that segment of nucleic acid codes, and this amino acid sequence determines the three-dimensional structure into which the protein folds. The three-dimensional structure of a protein is required for a protein to be functional. This hypothesis then lays the essential link between information stored and inherited in nucleic acids to the chemical processes which enable life to exist.

Or, as Crick put it in 1958:

This description is further amplified in the article and, in discussing how a protein folds up into its three-dimensional structure, Crick suggested that "the folding is simply a function of the order of the amino acids" in the protein.

References

See also 
 Central dogma of molecular biology

Nucleic acids
Biology theories